The stoat (Mustela erminea) was introduced into New Zealand to control introduced rabbits and hares, but is now a major threat to the native bird population. The natural range of the stoat is limited to parts of the Northern Hemisphere. Immediately before human settlement, New Zealand did not have any land-based mammals apart from bats, but Polynesian and European settlers introduced a wide variety of animals. Rarely, in Southland, the fur of stoats has been reported to turn white, being the fur known as ermine, which adorns royal robes.

Introductions of stoats
The rabbit was introduced by European settlers as a food and game animal, and by the 1870s it was becoming a serious threat to the newly developed farming economy. Farmers began demanding the introduction of mustelids (including stoats) to control the rabbit plague. Warnings about the dangers to bird life from stoats were given by scientists in New Zealand and Britain, including the New Zealand ornithologist Walter Buller. The warnings were ignored and stoats began to be introduced from Britain in the 1880s. Within six years, drastic declines in bird populations were noticed.

By 1930 the Auckland Acclimatisation Society was campaigning to end the protection of mustelids and cats.

The translocation efforts of New Zealand's pioneering conservationist Richard Henry were undone when stoats swam to Resolution Island. Stoats were eradicated from Chalky Island and other Fiordland islands in the early 2000s, and scientists assumed that they would be unable to cross a 300 m water barrier, but stoats turned out to be able to reinvade: DNA testing confirmed that stoats regularly swim towards islands in summer, especially in beech mast years, and prefer long coastlines. In December 2010, a stoat was seen on what was thought to be the stoat-free Kapiti Island, and by August the next year the New Zealand Department of Conservation had managed to kill three. It seems unlikely that a stoat could cross the five-kilometre stretch of open sea from the Kapiti Coast but they are accomplished swimmers: in an experiment in a flume tank, a stoat paddled against a moderate current for two hours without stopping, the equivalent of swimming 1.8 km.

Threat to bird life
New Zealand has a high proportion of ground-nesting and flightless birds, due to its long geographical isolation and a lack of mammal predators. Native birds have evolved to fill niches that are occupied by mammals in most other places. Stoats are the greatest threat to these ground-nesting and hole-nesting birds, which have very limited means of escaping stoat predation. In some areas the whio population is now 70% male, from stoats attacking female ducks incubating eggs.

In addition to birds, stoats eat insects, mice and rats. During "beech masts", when southern beech trees (Nothofagus species) produce a far greater amount of seed than normal, the stoat population undergoes changes in predation behaviour. With high beech-seed numbers, rats and mice become more plentiful, and the increase in prey encourages stoat breeding. The higher stoat numbers reduce the rodent population and the stoats then prey on birds. For instance, the wild population of the endangered takahe dropped by a third between 2006 and 2007, after a stoat plague triggered by the 2005–2006 mast wiped out more than half the takahe in areas where stoat numbers were not limited by trapping.

Control measures

Stoats are difficult to control since they are bait-shy, trap-wary, and have high fecundity. In some areas where there are populations of endangered birds, a programme of stoat-trapping has been implemented. The most common method of trapping is to use a stoat tunnel – a wooden box with a small entrance at one end to allow the stoat to enter. The bait is often an egg and a trap is placed in the tunnel to kill the stoat. Recent trials of a new design of self-resetting stoat traps for remote areas have been encouraging.

"Mainland Islands", protected areas on the mainland of New Zealand that employ intensive control of introduced pests, have stoat trapping on their perimeter. Predator-proof fences, using fine wire-mesh netting, are used to keep stoats out of protected areas. Methods of restricting stoat breeding have also been investigated.

Legislation
Although stoats were recognised as a potential pest before being introduced into New Zealand, they were given protection as late as 1936. As a means of preventing a loss of biodiversity, there are now severe penalties for introducing stoats into protected areas.

See also
Conservation in New Zealand
Birds of New Zealand
Invasive species in New Zealand

References

External links
Stoats at the Department of Conservation
Ferret and Stoat Research at Landcare Research
Stoats and cats at Te Ara: The Encyclopedia of New Zealand
"Death unleashed", Otago Daily Times, 24 January 2022

Nature conservation in New Zealand
Invasive animal species in New Zealand
Invasive mammal species
Mammals of New Zealand